Hypsolebias is a genus of small fish in the family Rivulidae that are endemic the Caatinga, Cerrado and nearby regions in Brazil. The greatest richness is in the São Francisco River basin, but there are also species in the Tocantins, Jequitinhonha and Jaguaribe systems, as well as smaller river basins in northeastern Brazil. Like their relatives, Hypsolebias are annual killifish. The short-lived adults inhabit temporary waters like rain pools, laying their eggs in the bottom. As their habitat dries up the adults die, but the eggs survive and hatch when the water returns in the next season.

The males are more colorful than the females, and male colors/patterns are a primary way of separating the different species.

Species

Hypsolebias was formerly regarded as a subgenus of Simpsonichthys. Although this split is generally accepted, a genetic study indicates that Hypsolebias is not monophyletic.

There are 35 currently recognized species in Hypsolebias:

 Hypsolebias adornatus (W. J. E. M. Costa, 2000)
 Hypsolebias antenori (Tulipano, 1973)
 Hypsolebias auratus (W. J. E. M. Costa & D. T. B. Nielsen, 2000)
 Hypsolebias brunoi (W. J. E. M. Costa, 2003)
 Hypsolebias caeruleus W. J. E. M. Costa, 2013
 Hypsolebias carlettoi (W. J. E. M. Costa & D. T. B. Nielsen, 2004)
 Hypsolebias coamazonicus W. J. E. M. Costa, Amorim & Bragança, 2014
 Hypsolebias faouri Britzke, D. T. B. Nielsen & C. de Oliveira, 2016
 Hypsolebias flagellatus (W. J. E. M. Costa, 2003)
 Hypsolebias flammeus (W. J. E. M. Costa, 1989)
 Hypsolebias flavicaudatus (W. J. E. M. Costa & G. C. Brasil, 1990)
 Hypsolebias fulminantis (W. J. E. M. Costa & G. C. Brasil, 1993)
 Hypsolebias ghisolfii (W. J. E. M. Costa, Cyrino & D. T. B. Nielsen, 1996)
 Hypsolebias gilbertobrasili W. J. E. M. Costa, 2012
 Hypsolebias guanambi W. J. E. M. Costa & Amorim, 2011
 Hypsolebias harmonicus (W. J. E. M. Costa, 2010)
 Hypsolebias hellneri (Berkenkamp, 1993)
 Hypsolebias igneus (W. J. E. M. Costa, 2000)
 Hypsolebias janaubensis (W. J. E. M. Costa, 2006)
 Hypsolebias longignatus (W. J. E. M. Costa, 2008)
 Hypsolebias lopesi (D. T. B. Nielsen, Shibatta, Suzart & A. F. Martín, 2010)
 Hypsolebias macaubensis (W. J. E. M. Costa & Suzart, 2006)
 Hypsolebias magnificus (W. J. E. M. Costa & G. C. Brasil, 1991)
 Hypsolebias martinsi Britzke, D. T. B. Nielsen & C. de Oliveira, 2016
 Hypsolebias mediopapillatus (W. J. E. M. Costa, 2006)
 Hypsolebias nitens W. J. E. M. Costa, 2012
 Hypsolebias notatus (W. J. E. M. Costa, Lacerda & G. C. Brasil, 1990)
 Hypsolebias nudiorbitatus W. J. E. M. Costa, 2011
 Hypsolebias picturatus (W. J. E. M. Costa, 2000)
 Hypsolebias pterophyllus W. J. E. M. Costa, 2012
 Hypsolebias radiosus (W. J. E. M. Costa & G. C. Brasil, 2004)
 Hypsolebias radiseriatus W. J. E. M. Costa, 2012
 Hypsolebias sertanejo W. J. E. M. Costa, 2012
 Hypsolebias shibattai D. T. B. Nielsen, M. Martins, L. M. de Araújo & Suzart, 2014
 Hypsolebias tocantinensis D. T. B. Nielsen, J. C. da Cruz & A. C. Baptista, 2012
 Hypsolebias trifasciatus  D. T. B. Nielsen, M. Martins, L. M. de Araújo, F. O. de Lira & A. F. Martín, 2014

References

Rivulidae
Freshwater fish genera